Crown Hill is a ghost town in Lawrence County, in the U.S. state of South Dakota.

History
Crown Hill took its name from the nearby Crown Hill Mine, operated by the Crown Mining Company.

References

Geography of Lawrence County, South Dakota
Ghost towns in South Dakota